Cariño  is a municipality in the province of A Coruña, in the autonomous community of Galicia, northwestern Spain. It is situated in the north of the province and located on the Ría de Ortigueira y Ladrido (Ortigueira and Ladrido tidal inlet). Cariño has a population of 3,699 inhabitants (INE, 2022).

Cariño and Cedeira's  coast has some of the highest cliffs in Europe.

References

Municipalities in the Province of A Coruña
Port cities and towns on the Spanish Atlantic coast